Tony Trabert defeated Vic Seixas 6–3, 6–2, 6–3 in the final to win the men's singles tennis title at the 1953 U.S. National Championships.

Seeds
The tournament used two lists of eight players for seeding the men's singles event; one for U.S. players and one for foreign players. Tony Trabert is the champion; others show the round in which they were eliminated.

U.S.
  Vic Seixas (finalist)
  Tony Trabert (champion)
  Gardnar Mulloy (quarterfinals)
  Arthur Larsen (fourth round)
  Ham Richardson (fourth round)
  Straight Clark (third round)
  Budge Patty (quarterfinals)
  Tom Brown (fourth round)

Foreign
  Ken Rosewall (semifinals)
  Lew Hoad (semifinals)
  Mervyn Rose (fourth round)
  Kurt Nielsen (quarterfinals)
  Rex Hartwig (second round)
  Enrique Morea (second round)
  Sven Davidson (quarterfinals)
  Ian Ayre (fourth round)

Draw

Key
 Q = Qualifier
 WC = Wild card
 LL = Lucky loser
 r = Retired

Final eight

Earlier rounds

Section 1

Section 2

Section 3

Section 4

Section 5

Section 6

Section 7

Section 8

References

External links
 1953 U.S. National Championships on ITFtennis.com, the source for this draw

Men's Singles
U.S. National Championships (tennis) by year – Men's singles